Martin Viessmann (born 1953/54) is a German billionaire businessman, CEO of Viessmann Group, a heating systems manufacturer headquartered in Allendorf, Germany.

Early life
Martin Viessmann is the son of Hans Viessmann and the grandson of Johann Viessmann, who founded Viessmann Group in 1917. He has a diploma from the University of Erlangen.

Career
Viessmann is CEO of the Viessmann Group.

The Manager Magazin listed Viessmann in 51st place on its list of the 500 richest Germans in 2013, with an estimated fortune at 2.15 billion euro (2012: 1.95 billion euro). According to the 2021 Forbes list, Viessmann's fortune is around $1.8 billion. This puts him in 1750th place on the Forbes list of the world's richest people.

Philanthropy
In 2012, Greg Kleinheinz was appointed as the first Viessmann Endowed Chair in Sustainable Technology at the University of Wisconsin Oshkosh, created with an endowment from Viessmann and his wife Annette.

Honours and awards 

 Federal Cross of Merit: 1st Class of the Order of Merit of the Federal Republic of Germany, 2004
Energy Globe Award for Sustainability in the "Air" category, 2012
Greentech Manager of the Year, 2013
 Handelsblatt Hall of Fame der Familienunternehmen, 2020

Personal life
Viessmann and his wife Annette have two children, Katharina and Maximilian, and live in Allendorf, Germany.

References

Living people
German billionaires
Commanders Crosses of the Order of Merit of the Federal Republic of Germany
1950s births
20th-century German businesspeople
21st-century German businesspeople